Virgil Okiring (born 25 September 1942) is a Ugandan hurdler. He competed in the men's 110 metres hurdles at the 1964 Summer Olympics.

References

1942 births
Living people
Athletes (track and field) at the 1964 Summer Olympics
Ugandan male hurdlers
Olympic athletes of Uganda
Place of birth missing (living people)